Asel Kulathunga (born 2 December 1997) is a Sri Lankan cricketer. He made his List A debut for Sinhalese Sports Club in the 2018–19 Premier Limited Overs Tournament on 6 March 2019.

References

External links
 

1997 births
Living people
Sri Lankan cricketers
Sinhalese Sports Club cricketers
Place of birth missing (living people)